Marutirao Parab, popularly known simply as Maruti, was an Indian actor and director best known for playing comic roles in Hindi films.

Personal life
Parab was married to Kamal - a small time star in Hindi films who appeared in movies like Dashera (1956), Tatar Ka Chor (1955), Garma Garam (1957), Darbar (1955), Riyasat (1955) etc.

Career
Parab was best known for Kahin Aar Kahin Paar (1971), Hum Sab Ustad Hain (1965) and Khaan Dost (1976). He directed films like Hum Sab Ustad Hain, Hum Sab Chor Hain, Baaghi Shehzaada and the Joy Mukherjee starrer - Kahin Aar Kahin Paar.

Legacy
One of his daughters, Guddi Maruti, is an Indian actress best known for her comedy roles on TV and Bollywood movies.

Partial filmography

As actor 

 1948 Gajre
 1948 Satyavan Savitri 
 1950 Dilruba
 1951 Albela
 1951 Pyar Ki Baten
 1953 Chacha Chowdhury 
 1953 Foot Path
 1953 Papi
 1954 Alibaba and 40 Thieves
 1954 Laadla 
 1954 Lal Pari 
 1954 Radha Krishna 
 1954 Tilottama 
 1955 Alladin Ka Beta 
 1955 Baap Re Baap
 1955 Baghdad Ka Chor 
 1955 Chirag-e-Cheen 
 1955 Hatimtai Ki Beti
 1955 Khandaan 
 1955 Mast Qalandar 
 1955 Naqab 
 1955 Oot Patang 
 1955 Patit Pawan
 1955 Ratna Manjari 
 1955 Son of Ali Baba 
 1955 Tatar Ka Chor 
 1955 Yasmin 
 1956 Aawaz
 1956 Chori Chori
 1956 Harihar Bhakti
 1956 Panna 
 1956 Roop Kumari 
 1956 Sajani
 1956 Sajni
 1956 Sudarshan Chakra
 1956 Taj Aur Talwar 
 1956 Talwar Ka Dhani 
 1956 Yahudi Ki Beti 
 1957 Hill Station 
 1957 Hum Panchhi Ek Daal Ke
 1957 Inspector
 1957 Jahazi Lutera 
 1957 Jannat
 1957 Khuda Ka Banda 
 1957 Miss Mary 
 1957 Naag Padmani 
 1958 Akash Pari
 1958 Chaubees Ghante 
 1958 Daughter of Sindbad
 1958 Night Club
 1959 Bhakt Pralhad 
 1959 Bus Conductor
 1959 Commander 
 1959 Guest House
 1959 Jagga Daku
 1959 Kya Yeh Bombai Hai
 1959 Main Nashe Men Hoon
 1960 Alamara Ki Beti
 1960 Chand Mere Aja 
 1960 Chandramukhi 
 1961 Walait Pass (punjabi movie)
 1961 Apsara 
 1961 Boy Friend
 1961 Opera House
 1961 Reshmi Rumal 
 1961 Sampoorna Ramayana
 1962 Kala Samundar 
 1962 Naqli Nawab
 1962 Vallah Kya Baat Hai
 1963 Baghi Shehzada 
 1963 Cobra Girl
 1963 Ek Tha Alibaba 
 1963 Meri Surat Teri Ankhen
 1963 Parasmani
 1963 Zingaro 
 1964 Aaya Toofan
 1964 Daal Me Kala
 1964 Hercules 
 1964 Idd Ka Chand 
 1964 Main Jatti Punjab Di
 1964 Tere Dwaar Khada Bhagwan
 1965 Faraar 
 1965 Hum Diwane 
 1965 Hum Sab Ustad Hain
 1965 Lootera
 1965 Mahabharat
 1965 Rustom-E-Hind 
 1965 Sab Ka Ustad
 1965 Sangram
 1965 Son of Hatimtai 
 1965 Teen Sardar
 1966 Aakhri Khat
 1966 Bahadur Daku
 1966 Chhota Bhai
 1966 Husn Ka Ghulam 
 1966 Sher E Afghan 
 1967 Hum Do Daku
 1967 Majhli Didi
 1967 Shamsheer
 1968 Fareb 
 1968 Raja Aur Runk
 1968 Watan Se Door 
 1969 Apna Khoon Apna Dushman 
 1969 Bank Robbery 
 1969 Beqasoor
 1969 Do Bhai
 1969 Nannha Farishta
 1969 Raate Ke Andhere Mein 
 1969 The Thief of Baghdad
 1969 Ustad 420
 1970 Aansoo Aur Muskan
 1970 Ghar Ghar Ki Kahani
 1970 Mangu Dada
 1970 Mera Naam Joker
 1971 Preet Ki Dori
 1972 Shiv Bhakat Baba Balak Nath 
 1972 Shor 
 1973 Banarasi Babu
 1973 Door Nahin Manzil
 1973 Ek Nari Do Roop
 1973 Heera Panna 
 1973 Hum Sab Chor Hain 
 1973 Keemat 
 1973 Mera Desh Mera Dharam 
 1973 Naag Mere Saathi 
 1973 Sabak
 1974 Albeli 
 1974 Badhti Ka Naam Dadhi
 1974 Dost (1974 film)
 1974 Hanuman Vijay
 1974 Ishq Ishq Ishq
 1974 Kunwara Baap
 1974 Pran Jaye Par Vachan Na Jaye
 1974 Thokar 
 1974 Zehreela Insaan
 1975 Anokha
 1975 Chori Mera Kaam
 1975 Kaala Sona
 1975 Pratiggya
 1975 Rani Aur Lalpari 
 1976 Aadalat
 1976 Gumrah
 1976 Khaan Dost
 1976 Nagin
 1977 Aadmi Sadak Ka
 1977 Agar... If 
 1977 Chaalu Mera Naam
 1977 Chakkar Pe Chakkar
 1977 Charandas
 1977 Daku Aur Mahatma
 1977 Dildaar
 1977 Do Chehere
 1977 Ek Hi Raasta 
 1977 Kalabaaz 
 1977 Khel Khilari Ka
 1977 Saheb Bahadur
 1977 Tinku
 1977 Yaaron Ka Yaar
 1978 Anpadh
 1978 Bhola Bhala
 1978 Chor Ke Ghar Chor
 1978 Damaad
 1978 Don
 1978 Ek Baap Chhe Bete
 1979 Guru Ho Jaa Shuru
 1979 Jaani Dushman 
 1979 Naya Bakra
 1979 Shabhash Daddy
 1980 Hum Nahin Sudhrenge
 1980 Chunaoti
 1980 Saboot
1980  Shaan (1980 film)
 1981 Plot No. 5
 1981 Professor Pyarelal
 1983 Karate
 1983 Paanchwin Manzil

As director 
 1965 Hum Sab Ustad Hain
 1970 Mangu Dada
 1971 Kahin Aar Kahin Paar
 1973 Hum Sab Chor Hain

As writer 
 1959 Bus Conductor
 1965 Hum Sab Ustad Hain (scenario)

References

External links
 

Indian male film actors
Male actors in Hindi cinema
Indian male comedians
20th-century Indian male actors
20th-century Indian film directors
Film directors from Mumbai
Hindi-language film directors